USS O-1 (SS-62) was the lead ship of her class of submarines built for the United States Navy during World War I.

Description
The O-class submarines were designed to meet a Navy requirement for coastal defense boats. They displaced  on the surface and  submerged. The O-class submarines had a crew of 29 officers and enlisted men.

For surface running, the boats were powered by two  diesel engines, each driving one propeller shaft. When submerged each propeller was driven by a  electric motor. They could reach  on the surface and  underwater.

The boats were armed with four 18 inch (450 mm)  torpedo tubes in the bow. They carried four reloads, for a total of eight torpedoes. The O-class submarines were also armed with a single 3"/50 caliber deck gun.

Construction and career

O-1 was laid down on 26 March 1917 at the Portsmouth Navy Yard in Kittery, Maine.  She was launched on 9 July 1918, and commissioned on 5 November 1918 with Lieutenant Commander Norman L. Kirk in command. Commissioned just before the Armistice with Germany, O-1 operated in the Atlantic coastal waters from Cape Cod to Key West, Florida, after World War I. Reclassified a second-line submarine on 25 July 1924, and first-line on 6 June 1928, O-1 was converted to an experimental vessel on 28 December 1930, and operated in this capacity out of the submarine base at New London, Connecticut, until decommissioning on 11 June 1931. She was stricken from the Naval Vessel Register on 18 May 1938 and sold for scrap.

Gallery

Notes

References

External links
 

United States O-class submarines
World War I submarines of the United States
Ships built in Kittery, Maine
1918 ships